The Ladies Italian Open is a professional golf tournament on the Ladies European Tour held in Italy since 1987.

After a hiatus the tournament returned to the LET schedule in 2021.

Winners

See also
Italian Open

References

External links
Ladies European Tour

Italian Open
Golf tournaments in Italy
Recurring sporting events established in 1987